The 1913 Copa del Rey Final (UECF) was the 12th final of the Spanish cup competition, the Copa del Rey. The two-legged final was contested by FC Barcelona and Real Sociedad, with all the matches being played at Camp de la Indústria in Barcelona.

The first leg, held on 16 March, ended with a 2–2 draw thanks to a last-minute goal from Sociedad's Juan Artola, while the second leg also ended in a tie (0–0). The resultant playoff game was scheduled for 23 March due to the Holy Week celebrations in Spain, in that match Barcelona defeated Real Sociedad 2–1, winning the trophy for the third time in their history.

Match details

First leg

Second leg

Playoff 

|}

See also
1910 UECF Copa del Rey Final
1913 FEF Copa del Rey Final

References

1913
UECF
FC Barcelona matches
Real Sociedad matches